Admiral Sir Ralph Alan Bevan Edwards KCB CBE (31 March 1901 – 4 February 1963) was a Royal Navy officer who served as Commander-in-Chief, Mediterranean Fleet.

Naval career
Edwards joined the Royal Navy in 1914 and served in the battlecruiser HMS Tiger in the Grand Fleet during World War I.

In World War II, he served as Deputy Director and then as Director of the Operations Division for the Home Fleet. During this time, he oversaw the operation to sink the German battleship Bismarck. He then became Chief of Staff for the Eastern Fleet and, from March 1945, was Captain of HMNZS Gambia.

After the war he was made Captain of the aircraft carrier . He became Assistant Chief of Naval Staff in 1948. In July, 1951, he returned to sea in command of the First Cruiser Squadron and as Flag Officer (Air), Mediterranean, hoisting his flag in his old ship the Gambia. From November 1951, he was also Flag Officer, Second in Command of the Mediterranean Fleet. He then became Third Sea Lord and Controller of the Navy in 1953. His last appointment was as Commander-in-Chief, Mediterranean Fleet and NATO Commander Allied Forces Mediterranean in 1957. He retired in 1958.

Family
In 1932 he married Joan Le Fowne Hurt; they had one son and one daughter.

References

External links 

 Papers of Admiral Sir Ralph Alan Bevan Edwards held at Churchill Archives Centre

|-

1901 births
1963 deaths
Royal Navy admirals
Knights Commander of the Order of the Bath
Commanders of the Order of the British Empire
Lords of the Admiralty
Royal Navy officers of World War I
Royal Navy officers of World War II